Meprin A subunit beta is a protein that in humans is encoded by the MEP1B gene.

Meprins are multidomain zinc metalloproteases that are highly expressed in mammalian kidney and intestinal brush border membranes and in leukocytes and certain cancer cells. Mature meprins are oligomers of evolutionarily related, separately encoded alpha and/or beta subunits. Homooligomers of meprin-alpha (MEP1A; MIM 600388) are secreted; oligomers containing meprin-beta are associated with the plasma membrane. Substrates include bioactive peptides and extracellular matrix proteins. See MIM 600388 for further information on meprins.[supplied by OMIM]

References

Further reading